South Surrey—White Rock—Cloverdale was a federal electoral district in British Columbia, Canada, that was represented in the House of Commons of Canada from 2004 until the 2015 election.

History
This electoral district was created in 2003 from parts of South Surrey—White Rock—Langley and Surrey Central ridings. This riding was dissolved into South Surrey—White Rock and Cloverdale—Langley City during the 2012 electoral redistribution.

Member of Parliament

Election results

See also
 List of Canadian federal electoral districts
 Past Canadian electoral districts

References

Notes

External links
 Website of the Parliament of Canada
 Riding history from the Library of Parliament

Former federal electoral districts of British Columbia
Politics of Surrey, British Columbia
White Rock, British Columbia